Partial general elections were held in Belgium on 8 June 1852. In the elections for the Chamber of Representatives the result was a victory for the Liberal Party, who won 57 of the 108 seats. Voter turnout was 69.2%, although only 42,053 people were eligible to vote.

Under the alternating system, Chamber elections were only held in four out of the nine provinces: East Flanders, Hainaut, Liège and Limburg. Thus, 54 of the 108 Chamber seats were up for election.

Results

Chamber of Representatives

Constituencies
The division of seats among the electoral districts was as follows:

References

1850s elections in Belgium
General
Belgium
Belgium